Antti Ojanperä (born 6 April 1983) is a retired Finnish footballer, who plays as midfielder or defender. Throughout his senior career he had represented Tampere United in the Finnish premier division Veikkausliiga, until he moved to FC Haka of the same league in 2011.

After spending two years in FC Haka he joined Ilves until retiring at the end of the season 2015.

Ojanperä was especially known for his long throw-ins.

References
 Guardian Football

1983 births
Finnish footballers
Living people
Veikkausliiga players
Tampere United players
Association football defenders
Footballers from Tampere